Mixed Blessings is a romance novel written by Danielle Steel. The plot follows three different couples, who have no correlation to each other trying to make ethical decisions about modern day lives and family life. The book was published by Dell Publishing in October 1993. It is Steel's 31st novel.

Plot summary
After the wedding of Diana Goode and Andrew Douglas, Diana comments that they will make a baby on their honeymoon. However, after the honeymoon period is over, she is still not pregnant. After repeated attempts, the couple both have to question their willingness to have a baby. The second couple consists of Charlie Winwood and Barbie Mason. The latter does not share Charlie's dreams of having a large family to raise in their house. After Charlie discovers he is sterile, he is forced to question his marriage, and his wife, who shares none of his dreams. The final couple is Pilar Graham, a successful lawyer from Santa Barbara, California and Brad Coleman, nineteen years older than she and father of two grown children. They are happy together until Pilar begins to alter her views on whether she should have a baby with Brad.

Television Adaptations
Mixed Blessings was adapted for television by NBC in 1995. Scott Baio, Bess Armstrong, Gabrielle Carteris, and Bruce Greenwood led the all-star cast.

Footnotes

1993 American novels
American novels adapted into films
American romance novels
American novels adapted into television shows
Novels by Danielle Steel
Delacorte Press books